Las Anod District is a district  in the eastern Sool region of Somaliland. It has its capital at Las Anod. Other settlements include Yagori, Adhi'adeye, Bo'ame, Tukaraq.

See also
Administrative divisions of Somaliland
Regions of Somaliland
Districts of Somaliland
Somalia–Somaliland border

References

External links
 Districts of Somalia
 Map of Laas Caanood District

Districts of Somaliland

Sool, Somaliland

Somaliland